The Pueblo II Period (AD 900 to AD 1150) was the second pueblo period of the Ancestral Puebloans of the Four Corners region of the American southwest.  During this period people lived in dwellings made of stone and mortar, enjoyed communal activities in kivas, built towers and dams for water conservation, and implemented milling bins for processing maize.  Communities with low-yield farms traded pottery with other settlements for maize.

The Pueblo II Period (Pecos Classification) is roughly similar to the second half of the "Developmental Pueblo Period" (AD 750 to AD 1100). It is preceded by the Pueblo I Period, and is followed by the Pueblo III Period.

Architecture
Villages were larger and had more community buildings than in the Pueblo I Period.  Structures were generally made of stone masonry.  By AD 1075, double-coursed masonry was sometimes used, which allowed for second story construction.  Homes made of stone were more sturdy and fire-proof than the materials used previously.  The grouping of the pueblos were called "unit pueblos".<ref name=MV-APC>[http://www.nps.gov/meve/forteachers/upload/ep_activity3_chronology.pdf Ancestral Puebloan Chronology (teaching aid).] Mesa Verde National Park, National Park Service. Retrieved 10-16-2011.</ref>  Some pueblo sites used a standard plan of front and back pairs of rooms which formed a common cluster of 12 rooms; The rear rooms were used for storage and the front rooms used as living areas.

Round-shaped, below ground and standardized kivas were used for ceremonial purposes. Trash mounds were generally placed south of the village.

Communities
 Four Corners Region. Due to the dry conditions in the southwest and growing population, communities responded by branching out and establishing new villages and farmland; More than 10,000 sites were established in a 150-year period.  During the Pueblo II Period, nearly every spot in the southwest that would support farming not in a flood plain was used for agriculture.   Hunter-gatherer artifacts are not found much in the Four Corners region during this period.  It is likely that they hunter-gatherer tribes were either forced to seek foraging land in other areas or they assimilated themselves into the Pueblo agricultural lifestyle.
 Mesa Verde. In the Mesa Verde National Park region, contiguous rows of rooms formed E, U and L shaped buildings, and were often formed around a plaza.
 Chaco Canyon. Elaborate, beautiful great houses from the Pueblo I Period continued to be built at Chaco Canyon into the 12th century.  The structures were much larger than previous dwellings. The multi-storied buildings had high ceilings, rooms with three or four times the space of domestic dwellings and elaborate kivas, such as great, tower and above ground kivas.
 Chimney Rock. Outlier of the Chaco Canyon regional system.

Culture and religion
 Religion. Community based activities emerged, including ceremonial rituals in great kivas.
 Wall art. Petroglyphs, which appeared in the Petrified Forest National Park during the Basketmaker periods, were made during the Pueblo II and III Periods throughout the Little Colorado River basin.  Some of the petroglyphs were solar markers that marked seasonal passage of time between seasonal equinoxes and solstices based upon the suns position in the sky.Petrified Forest National Park Celebrates the Summer Solstice. Petrified Forest National Park, National Park Service.  Retrieved 10-16-2011.

Agriculture
Production and use of water conservation dams and reservoirs were also a community-based activities. Terraced, silt-retaining check dams were created on sloping drainage areas where melting snow or rain water ran downhill through the terraced dams. The dams retained moisture and silt and effectively managed runoff to lower terraces which made an ideal scenario for southwestern agriculture.

The population grew during this period, requiring greater amounts of food for the villages. To increase their yield, there was experimentation to cultivate larger corn cobs, including the Mexican or southern Arizona maize blanco and oñaveno, and locally produced hybrids. They supplemented their diet with hunting and wild plants found on small patches of land unsuitable for farming, but as the land became over-populated, wild food and game became scarce.

The optimal southwestern farming locations were adjacent to springs, seeps or marshes.  Early in the Pueblo II period, the most desirable spots had been taken and, presumably young, families searched out open land to farm, hoping that precipitation would be sufficient to support their crops.  There were periods of time of seasonal hunger and drought when people moved away from their villages and returned "following the rains," stories told by elders of pueblo communities.  Evidence of near starvation as children are evident in the interrupted growth lines in their bones and enamel hypoplasias'' in their teeth.

The number rooms for work areas and storage increased during this period.  Often the rooms were in the residential buildings, in some cases there were deep pit-houses.  Nearly 25% of the rooms were used for grinding corn on metates and storing the grain in mealing bins.  The mealing bins were designed for grinding areas, where the bins were set alongside one another during a communal effort to grind corn using metates and manos.

Pottery
Common pottery include corrugated gray ware pottery and decorated black-on-white pottery.  Corrugated pottery was made from coils of clay wound into the desired shape and the clay is pinched, which created the corrugated texture.  In addition to the common gray were used for cooking and storage, pottery from this period included bowls, jars with lids, mugs, ladles, canteens, pitchers, and effigy pots in bird and animals shapes.

Pottery was used in trade for food in low-productive farming areas.  This helped supplement the diets of people who needed to barter for food – and allowed those with very productive lands to focus on farming.  For instance, Chaco Canyon area produced large amounts of surplus food which was traded for pottery.

Other material goods
Material goods changed little from the previous periods, such as:  
 stone tools, such as axes, hammerstones, pecking stones, knives and scrapers
 manos and metates to grind corn and plants
 bone awls, scrapers, flakers, projectile points
 bow and arrows
 snares
 pottery
 digging sticks
 clothing made from cotton, yucca or hides
 hard cradle boards introduced in Pueblo I
 gaming pieces, pendants and beads

Cultural groups and periods
The cultural groups of this period include:
 Ancestral Puebloans – southern Utah, southern Colorado, northern Arizona and northern and central New Mexico.
 Hohokam – southern Arizona.
 Mogollon – southeastern Arizona, southern New Mexico and northern Mexico.
 Patayan – western Arizona, California and Baja California.

Notable Pueblo II sites

References 

Native American history of Arizona
Native American history of Colorado
Native American history of Nevada
Native American history of New Mexico
Native American history of Utah
Oasisamerica cultures
Pueblo history
Southwest periods in North America by Pecos classification
10th century in North America
11th century in North America
12th century in North America